The 2019 World RX of Sweden was the sixth round of the sixth season of the FIA World Rallycross Championship.  The event was held at the Höljesbanan in the village of Höljes, Värmland.

Supercar 

Source

Heats

Semi-finals 

 Semi-Final 1

 Semi-Final 2

Final

Standings after the event 

Source

 Note: Only the top six positions are included.

References 

|- style="text-align:center"
|width="35%"|Previous race:2019 World RX of Norway
|width="40%"|FIA World Rallycross Championship2019 season
|width="35%"|Next race:2019 World RX of Canada
|- style="text-align:center"
|width="35%"|Previous race:2018 World RX of Sweden
|width="40%"|World RX of Sweden
|width="35%"|Next race:2020 World RX of Sweden
|- style="text-align:center"

Sweden
World RX
World RX